The 2018–19 Isle of Man League was the 110th season of the Isle of Man Football League on the Isle of Man.  St Georges were the defending champions, having won the previous three championships.

Promotion and relegation following the 2017–18 season

From the Premier League 
 Relegated to Division 2
 Ramsey
 Colby

From Division Two 
 Promoted to the Premier League
 Marown
 Castletown Metropolitan

Premier League

Teams

League table

Division Two

Teams

League table

References 

Isle of Man Football League seasons
Man
Foot
Foot